GHZ or GHz may refer to:

Chabab Ghazieh SC, a Lebanese association football club
Gigahertz (GHz), unit of frequency
 Greenberger–Horne–Zeilinger state, a specific entangled quantum state of three or more particles
 GHZ experiment, an experiment associated with such a state
 Galactic Habitable Zone, the region of a galaxy that is favorable to the formation of life
 Green Hill Zone, the first level in Sonic the Hedgehog